The 2015 Delaware Fightin' Blue Hens football team represented the University of Delaware as a member of the Colonial Athletic Association (CAA) during the 2015 NCAA Division I FCS football season. Led by third-year head coach Dave Brock, the Fightin' Blue Hens compiled an overall record of 4–7 with a mark of 3–5 in conference play, placing in a four-way tie for seventh in the CAA. The team played home games at Delaware Stadium in Newark, Delaware.

Previous season

The Hens would start the season flat by falling 62–0 at FBS opponent Pittsburgh.  After a 3–0 September, the Hens struggled through October, ending the month with a 4–4 (2–2 CAA) record.  They would split the games in November to end the season at 6–6 (4–4 CAA).

Schedule

Coaching staff

Preseason

Recruiting class
Delaware announced signing a class of 22 incoming freshmen on February 4, 2015.

Game summaries

Jacksonville

 Passing leaders: Kade Bell (JU): 25–43, 269 yd., 1 TD, 1 INT; Blake Rankin (UD): 6–10, 60 yd.
 Rushing leaders: Wes Hills (UD): 16 car., 88 yd.; Kade Bell (JU): 8 car., 28 yd.
 Receiving leaders: Andy Jones (JU): 9 rec., 118 yd., 1 TD; Diante Cherry (UD): 5 rec., 68 yd.

Lafayette

Passing Leaders: Blake Searfoss (LC): 13–24, 171 yds., 1 INT; Joe Walker (UD): 4–15, 58 yds.
Rushing Leaders: Kareem Williams (UD): 14 car., 93 yds.; DeSean Brown (LC): 17 car. 84 yds.
Receiving Leaders: Matt Mrazek (LC): 3 rec., 68 yds.; Ryley Angeline (UD): 1 rec., 41 yds.

Villanova

Villanova ended their 2014 season with an NCAA Quarterfinal loss to Sam Houston State.
Passing Leaders: John Robertson (VU): 14–24, 208 yds., 1 TD; Joe Walker (UD): 13–28, 94 yds., 1 INT
Rushing Leaders: Jalen Randolph (UD): 14 car., 84 yds., 1 TD; Gary Underwood (VU): 9 car. 34 yds.
Receiving Leaders: Kevin Gulyas (VU): 8 rec., 152 yds., 1 TD; Diante Cherry (UD): 8 rec., 78 yds.

North Carolina

North Carolina ended their 2014 season with a loss in the Quick Lane Bowl to Rutgers.
This was the first Delaware football game in the state of North Carolina.
Passing Leaders: Mitch Trubisky (UNC): 17–20, 312 yds., 4 TD; Joe Walker (UD): 4–10, 24 yds., 1 INT
Rushing Leaders: Thomas Jefferson (UD): 22 car., 163 yds., 2 TD; Elijah Hood (UNC): 14 car. 61 yds.
Receiving Leaders: Mack Hollins (UNC): 3 rec., 100 yds., 2 TD; Tre Brown (UD): 1 rec., 9 yds.
Thomas Jefferson was named CAA Rookie of the Week

William & Mary

Passing Leaders: Steve Cluley (W&M): 8–20, 168 yds., 1 TD; Joe Walker (UD): 6–17, 71 yds., 1 TD
Rushing Leaders: Thomas Jefferson (UD): 28 car., 174 yds.; Kendall Anderson (W&M): 23 car. 101 yds.
Receiving Leaders: DeVonte Dedmond (W&M): 1 rec., 57 yds., 1 TD; Jamie Jarmon (UD): 7 rec., 56 yds.
Thomas Jefferson was named CAA Rookie of the Week

Rhode Island

Passing Leaders: Paul Mroz (URI): 9–22, 90 yds.; Joe Walker (UD): 9–22, 71 yds., 3 INT
Rushing Leaders: Harold Cooper (URI): 28 car., 123 yds., 1 TD; Joe Walker (UD): 13 car. 76 yds.
Receiving Leaders: Khayri Denny (URI): 3 rec., 34 yds.; Que'Shawn Jenkins (UD): 1 rec., 28 yds.

New Hampshire

New Hampshire ended their 2014 season with a CAA championship and an NCAA Semifinal loss to Illinois State.
Passing Leaders: Sean Goldrich (UNH): 18–33, 129 yds., 1 TD, 1 INT; Joe Walker (UD): 7–11, 71 yds. 
Rushing Leaders: Kareem Williams (UD): 16 car., 140 yds., 1 TD; Dalton Crossan (UNH): 10 car., 24 yds. 
Receiving Leaders: Thomas Jefferson (UD): 2 rec., 41 yds.; Kyon Taylor (UNH): 3 rec., 35 yds.
Thomas Jefferson was named CAA Rookie of the Week

Towson

Passing Leaders: Connor Frazier (TU): 25–34, 284 yds., 2 INT; Joe Walker (UD): 3–9, 14 yds., 1 INT
Rushing Leaders: Marquel Dickerson (TU): 20 car., 120 yds.; Kareem Williams (UD): 13 car., 46 yds. 
Receiving Leaders: Christian Summers (TU): 8 rec., 133 yds.; Diante Cherry (UD): 2 rec., 9 yds.

Albany

Passing Leaders: Joe Walker (UD): 7–10, 52 yds.; DJ Crook (UA): 4–11, 27 yds., 1 TD
Rushing Leaders: Elijah Ibitokun-Hanks (UA): 28 car., 135 yds.; Thomas Jefferson (UD): 10 car., 57 yds. 
Receiving Leaders: Diante Cherry (UD): 4 rec., 44 yds.; Zee Robinson (UA): 1 rec., 13 yds.

James Madison

James Madison ended their 2014 season with an NCAA First Round loss to Liberty.
Passing Leaders: Brian Schor (JMU): 18–32, 193 yds., 1 TD; Joe Walker (UD): 3–11, 22 yds.
Rushing Leaders: Thomas Jefferson (UD): 28 car., 120 yds.; Cardon Johnson (JMU): 14 car., 98 yds., 1 TD
Receiving Leaders: Rashard Davis (JMU): 5 rec., 73 yds.; Dionte Cherry (UD): 3 rec., 22 yds.

Elon

Passing Leaders: Connor Christiansen (ELON): 20–34, 243 yds., 1 TD, 1 INT; Joe Walker (UD): 9–17, 77 yds.
Rushing Leaders: Kareem Williams (UD): 18 car., 101 yds., 1 TD; Malcolm Summers (ELON): 12 car., 34 yds.
Receiving Leaders: Tereak McCray (ELON): 4 rec., 42 yds., 1 TD; Dionte Cherry (UD): 4 rec., 40 yds.

Season statistics
As of November 7, 2015:
Passing Leader: Joe Walker: 58–130, 506 yds., 1 TD, 6 INT (AVG: 6.4–14.4, 56.2 yds., 0.1 TD, 0.7 INT, 3.9 YPA)
Rushing Leader: Thomas Jefferson: 133 car., 715 yds., 6 TD (AVG: 14.8 car., 79.4 yds., 0.7 TD, 5.4 YPC)
Receiving Leader: Diante Cherry: 23 rec., 232 yds. (AVG: 3.2 rec., 33.1 yds., 10.1 YPR)

References

Delaware
Delaware Fightin' Blue Hens football seasons
Delaware Fightin' Blue Hens football